Nivin Pauly  (born 11 October 1984) is an Indian actor and producer who works predominantly in Malayalam films. He is a recipient of several awards including two Kerala State Film Awards and three Filmfare South awards. Nivin auditioned for and was cast in one of the main roles in Vineeth Sreenivasan's directorial debut Malarvaadi Arts Club in 2009, which was produced by actor Dileep. Nivin got his breakthrough with his lead role in the romantic film Thattathin Marayathu (2012), which was also directed by Vineeth Sreenivasan.

He came to be known for playing "boy next door" archetype following roles in the bilingual black-comedy thriller Neram (2013), the sports-drama 1983 (2014), the romantic-comedy Ohm Shanthi Oshaana (2014), the romantic-drama Bangalore Days (2014), the comedy road-thriller Oru Vadakkan Selfie (2015), and the coming-of-age romantic drama Premam (2015). Premam is among the top 10 highest-grossing Malayalam films. Nivin went on to star in the police drama Action Hero Biju (2016), the family drama Jacobinte Swargarajyam (2016), the political satire Sakhavu (2017), family comedy Njandukalude Nattil Oridavela (2017) and the epic film Kayamkulam Kochunni (2018) which is the third highest-grossing Malayalam film.

Nivin made his debut as a producer with Action Hero Biju under his production company Pauly Jr. Pictures. He then produced the family entertainer Njandukalude Nattil Oridavela. He won the Filmfare Award for Best Male Debut for his Tamil debut Neram (2013). In 2015, Nivin won the Kerala State Film Award for Best Actor for his performances in Bangalore Days and 1983.

He won the Filmfare Award for Best Actor – Malayalam for Action Hero Biju in 2016. In 2020, he won the Kerala State Film Award for Best Actor -Special Mention for his performance in Moothon. He also won the best actor award for the same film at the New York Indian Film Festival. Kanakam Kaamini Kalaham (2021) produced under his home banner and a direct-to-over-the-top release, is the first Malayalam movie to premiere on Disney+ Hotstar. Nivin had three releases in 2022 - Mahaveeryar, a fantasy flick; Padavettu, a political thriller; and the comedy entertainer,  Saturday Night.

Early life

Nivin was born to Suriyani Nasrani Catholic family on 11 October 1984 in Aluva, Ernakulam. Nivin's father, Pauly Bonaventure and his mother, Thressiamma Pauly worked in Aarau, Switzerland.  Nivin,was brought up in Kerala. He graduated with a Bachelor of Technology degree in Electronics & Communication Engineering from Federal Institute of Science and Technology (FISAT), Angamaly in 2006. Nivin was employed at Infosys in Bangalore through campus placements and worked as a software engineer from 2006 to 2008. However, he resigned and returned home after his father's death.

Career
Nivin auditioned for Malarvaadi Arts Club and was cast by Vineeth Sreenivasan in the role of Prakashan, which marked his debut. Following this, he acted in the films The Metro  and Sevenes, and did cameos in Traffic and Spanish Masala. He appeared in the music video Nenjodu Cherthu from the album Yuvvh, which The Hindu called "hugely popular" , and was a viral hit on YouTube.

The 2012 film Thattathin Marayathu was his acting vehicle, which became the biggest hit of the year. He played the role of Vinod, a Hindu boy madly in love with Ayesha, a Muslim girl. This was the second directorial venture of Vineeth Sreenivasan and is a milestone in Nivin's film career turning him into "the current youth sensation" and a much sought after actor. This also secured his position as one of the finest actors of the Malayalam film industry. He received offers from directors including Sathyan Anthikad, Rajesh Pillai, Aashiq Abu and Shyamaprasad.

Nivin made his debut in Tamil with the bilingual film Neram. His other Malayalam films in 2013 include 5 Sundarikal and Sunil Ibrahim's Arikil Oraal. The film was director Alphonse Puthren's directorial debut and was noted for its non-linear screenplay. He also acted in Shyamaprasad's English: An Autumn in London where he portrayed the character of a London-born dapper playboy. The latter was a psychological thriller in which he played the role of Ichcha, a waiter at a café. In 5 Sundarikal, he acted in the segment "Isha" directed by Sameer Thahir.

In 2014, he played the role of Rameshan in Abrid Shine's directorial debut 1983,  a coming-of-age sports film. His effortless portrayal of Rameshan from his school life, well into adulthood earned him the Best Actor Award at the 2014 Kerala State Film Awards.  This film also fetched him multiple other awards including the Best Actor (Malayalam) at the  Filmfare Awards South and  South Indian International Movie Awards,  and  Most Popular Actor at the Vanitha Film Awards.  This was followed with debutant Jude Anthany Joseph's romantic comedy Ohm Shanthi Oshaana, in which he portrayed the role of Giri and was released a week after 1983.  "Sify" stated that the director Jude Anthany Joseph "creates an engaging enough drama in Ohm Shanthi Oshaana, that you're happy to emotionally invest in [it]." His next release Bangalore Dayswas the coming-of-age romantic comedy drama directed by Anjali Menon. Nivin essayed the role of Krishnan "Kuttan" P P, a software engineer who is judgemental about modern life without really thinking about his own hypocrisies. This role was also taken into account by the jury for the Best Actor award at the 2014 Kerala State Film Awards. The film was released in 205 theatres across India, making it one of the biggest releases for a Malayalam film at the time.   In the same year, he played an extended cameo in the Lal Jose film Vikramadithyan.

In 2015, Nivin appeared in Mili, Oru Vadakkan Selfie and Ivide. He plays the role of a soft-skills trainer, Naveen in Mili, directed by Rajesh Pillai. He followed this up with the "road-comedy film" Oru Vadakkan Selfie, directed by G Prajith and scripted by Vineeth Sreenivasan. Filmibeat reviewed the movie, saying, "A hilarious entertainer for this Vishu season, which will make you laugh your heart out." This was followed by Ivide, a Malayalam crime drama in which he teamed up with Shyamaprasad for the second time.

He then acted in Premam, where he played the role of George David. It grossed over 600 million, and became one of the highest grossing Malayalam movies,catapulting him into the '50-crore club'. The film collected ₹2 crore from Tamil Nadu box office in its 300 days theatrical run making it the highest grossing Malayalam film in Tamil Nadu at the time.  Nivin's portrayal of George was featured in the Film Companion's 100 Greatest Performances of the Decade. Praising his performance, the Film Companion wrote: "His performance had charm, mischief, and most impressively, vulnerability."

Nivin turned producer with Action Hero Biju in 2016 under his banner Pauly Jr. Pictures. The film, a police procedural drama, was directed by Abrid Shine. As sub-inspector Biju Poulose, the film and the role portrays an honest look at the life of a police official. The film also has the highest opening gross for a Malayalam film in Tamil Nadu.  The movie was well received by the police fraternity in Kerala. He also starred in the family-drama Jacobinte Swargarajyam directed by Vineeth Srinivasan. Based on a true story, he played the role of Jerry, the son of Jacob Zacharia who struggles to clear his father's debts.

His next film was a political drama Sakhavu in which he played dual roles. Directed by Sidhartha Siva, this was the first dual role in his career, where he portrayed a student political leader and a senior social activist and comrade who fights for his left-wing ideals.

Nivin appeared in his first straight Tamil feature film through Gautham Ramachandran's crime drama Richie (2017), where he portrayed a small town thug. He also starred in the dramedy Njandukalude Nattil Oridavela. This film was his second outing as a producer. The film which was received well at the box office was a heart-warming story which portrayed that cancer is never the end of the road for everyone involved.

In 2018, the big-budget movie Kayamkulam Kochunni, directed by Rosshan Andrrews made a significant impact at the Kerala box office, and across all territories that it was released as well. This film put Nivin in the 100 crore club. He came together with Shyamaprased for a third time for the romantic-comedy Hey Jude. Nivin plays the role of a mathematical genius, yet socially awkward Jude who like his namesake Beatles song finds himself in spite of his perceived shortcomings.

2019 started off with his role of Dr Mikhael John in  Haneef Adeni's action-thriller Mikhael. This was followed by Love Action Drama, a romantic comedy which also saw commercial success at the box office. Nivin next appeared in Geetu Mohandas' film Moothon which was screened at several international film festivals worldwide including Toronto International Film Festival, New York Indian Film Festival, FFAST (Paris), Indian Film Festival of Melbourne and Mumbai Film Festival. He won the award for the best actor at the New York Indian Film Festival for his role in Moothon. Nivin effortlessly portrayed the dark and demoralising world of Moothon as Akbar which fetched him the Kerala State Film Awards – Special Mention in 2019.  The film was the screened as the opening film at the Mumbai Film Festival Mumbai Academy of the Moving Image and as the grand finale at the Indian Film Festival of Melbourne. Nivin's role as Akbar in this film was also featured in Film Companion's 100 Greatest Performances of the Decade.

In 2021, he starred in Ratheesh Balakrishnan Poduval's Kanakam Kaamini Kalaham, a family drama with satire and absurd-comedies elements.

Mahaveeryar was his first release of 2022, hit the theatres on July 21, 2022, to enormous critical and public acclaim.  The teaser of Mahaveeryar, a fantasy flick directed by Abrid Shine garnered 6 million views within 24 hours of launch making it the then most viewed teaser in Malayalam cinema. The next film, Padavettu, an action thriller movie directed by debutant Liju Krishna had its theatrical release on October 21, 2022, to excellent responses from both the critics and the audience. The trailer of Padavettu was launched to a full house at the inaugural match of the Indian Super League 2022 at the  Jawaharlal Nehru International Stadium, Kochi; making it the first film to have the trailer launch at the ISL. This was followed by Saturday Night, a comedy-drama entertainer directed by Rosshan Andrrews which explores the relationship between four friends was released on November 4, 2022.

Nivin is expected to appear soon on screen as Mattanchery Moidu in Rajeev Ravi's film Thuramukham which is awaiting a theatre release. Nivin will soon be seen in a Yezhu kadal Yezhu Malai a Tamil film directed by Ram. His other upcoming projects are Bismi Special, Gangster of Mundanmala, Thaaram and Shekara Varma Rajavu. He has also announced a new project titled Dear Students which is to be produced under his home banner.

In the media 
Following his multiple looks and his rustic style and swagger in Premam which became a style statement of the year, Nivin was chosen as the Most Desirable Man of 2015 by Kochi Times, a subsidiary of Times of India.

In early 2017, Nivin appeared as himself in the short film "No Go Tell" directed by Jude Anthany Joseph. This viral film was vetted by the Kerala State Commission for Protection of Child Rights and focuses on creating awareness amongst children about sexual abuse and child body safety.

Nivin was also part of the Kerala Strikers team in the Celebrity Cricket League. In addition, he was named the youth ambassador of the Kerala Blasters for the third edition of the Indian Super League.

Philanthropy and services 
Nivin was noted for his contributions during the unprecedented floods of 2018 in Kerala. He visited relief camps in his hometown Aluva and arranged basic necessities for the flood-affected people. He also met Chief Minister Pinarayi Vijayan to hand over his donation towards the Chief Minister's Distress Relief Fund (CMDRF).

He was also in the news for the "On-Call" campaign, where he called and spoke to the patients and healthcare workers during the lockdown, encouraging and thanking the latter for their selfless service.

Nivin was also a part of the launch of the "Drug-Free Kerala" campaign of the Vigilance and Anti Corruption Bureau (VACB) against corruption and narcotic substances

Personal life 
He married his college sweetheart Rinna Joy on 28 August 2010, at St. Dominic's Church in Aluva. They were classmates at FISAT. They have a son and a daughter.

Filmography

Films

All films are in Malayalam, unless otherwise noted.

Short films 

The short film directed by Alphonse Puthren was later included in the 2016 Tamil anthology film Aviyal.

As a producer 

All films are in Malayalam, produced under Nivin Pauly's home banner Pauly Jr. Pictures unless otherwise noted.

Music videos

Story idea

Awards and nominations

References

External links

 
 

Indian male film actors
Male actors from Kochi
Living people
Male actors in Malayalam cinema
Male actors in Tamil cinema
1984 births
21st-century Indian male actors
Malayalam film producers
Film producers from Kochi
People from Aluva
South Indian International Movie Awards winners
Indian Christians